Richard Wheeler may refer to:

Richard S. Wheeler (1935–2019), American novelist and newspaper editor
Richard "Dick" Wheeler (1922–2008), American military historian 
Dick Wheeler  (1898–1962), American baseball player